Garrett Serviss is the name of:

 Garrett P. Serviss (1851–1929), astronomer and early science fiction writer
 Garrett Serviss (athlete) (1881–1907), American high jumper, son of Garrett P. Serviss